Giles Anthony Fraser (born 27 November 1964) is an English Anglican priest, journalist and broadcaster who has served as Vicar of St Anne's Church, Kew, since 2022.   He is a regular contributor to Thought for the Day and The Guardian and a panellist on The Moral Maze, as well as an assistant editor of UnHerd.

Early life and education

Fraser was born to a Jewish father and a Christian mother and was circumcised according to Jewish tradition. 

He was educated at Hollingbury Court preparatory school in Sussex, where he was beaten several times a week by the headmaster for minor misdemeanours, and at Uppingham School, a fee-paying Christian school, where he became a Christian. He studied at Newcastle University before training for ordained ministry at Ripon College Cuddesdon, near Oxford. He continued his studies at the University of Lancaster, where he was awarded a PhD in 1999 with a thesis entitled Holy Nietzsche experiments in redemption.

Career
Fraser was ordained as a deacon in 1993 and as a priest in 1994, serving as curate of All Saints' Church in Streetly, Birmingham, from 1993 to 1997. From 1997 to 2006 he was a chaplain and then a lecturer in philosophy at Wadham College, Oxford. 

In 2000 he became Team Rector of St. Mary's Church, Putney, where he campaigned to raise the profile of the Putney Debates of 1647 and founded Inclusive Church, which campaigns for lesbian and gay inclusion within the church. 

From 2009 to 2011 he was canon chancellor of St Paul's Cathedral in London, with special responsibility for contemporary ethics and engagement with the City of London as a financial centre. In October 2011 Occupy London based its protest outside the cathedral, where Fraser said that he was happy for people to "exercise their right to protest peacefully". However, he resigned as he could not sanction any policy of the cathedral chapter that involved using force to remove the protesters. He has said that it was "a huge matter of regret to leave" St Paul's, "but not for one moment have I thought that I did the wrong thing".

He was also a visiting professor in the anthropology department at the London School of Economics and Director of the St Paul's Institute from 2009 to 2011. 

In 2012 Fraser was appointed Priest-in-charge of St Mary's, Newington, in south London, and in the spring of 2022 he became Vicar of St Anne's Church, Kew, in south-west London.

Since 2009 he has been an honorary canon of the Diocese of Sefwi-Wiawso in Ghana.

Views and writing
Fraser has been involved in social and political advocacy and, according to The Daily Telegraph, "would be the first to admit that he is fond of the sound of his own voice". In 2019 he claimed that "all my political energy has been a reaction to Margaret Thatcher. I hated and continue to hate Thatcherism with a passion that remains undimmed". 

In the 2016 referendum Fraser supported leaving the European Union, commenting that he found it "amazing that progressives are so keen to offer support to a remote and undemocratic bureaucracy that locks in a commitment to neoliberal economics". In 2019 he said he was "longing for a full-on Brexit – No Deal, please". In the 2019 general election he voted for the Conservative Party, even though he had just joined the Social Democratic Party.

From 2004 to 2013 Fraser had a weekly column in the Church Times and is also a regular contributor to The Guardian.

Fraser is the author or co-author of several books and is a specialist on the writings of the German philosopher Friedrich Nietzsche. He has lectured on moral leadership for the British Army at the Defence Academy at Shrivenham.

Personal life
Fraser has been married twice. With his first wife, Sally Aagaard, whom he married in 1993, he had two daughters and a son.

On 16 January 2016, Fraser announced his engagement to Lynn Tandler, an Israeli Jew, who is a weaver and academic researcher. They were married on 13 February 2016 and their son was born in November of the same year.

In June 2017 Fraser suffered a heart attack and successfully underwent surgery.

Awards and recognition
Fraser was awarded an honorary doctorate by Edge Hill University, Lancashire, in 2013 and by the Open University in 2015.

He was voted Stonewall Hero of the Year in 2012.

References

External links

Giles Fraser on The Guardian
Giles Fraser on UnHerd
Daily Telegraph: Pro-gay Vicar of Putney made an African Canon
 Putney Debates: Permanent exhibition sited inside St Mary’s Church, Putney
Extended interview on Nietzsche, Kundera, the Church and Occupy London

1964 births
Living people
21st-century English Anglican priests
Alumni of Lancaster University
Alumni of Newcastle University
Alumni of Ripon College Cuddesdon
Anglo-Catholic socialists
Chancellors of St Paul's Cathedral
English Christian socialists
English people of Jewish descent
English LGBT rights activists
People associated with Edge Hill University
People associated with the Open University
People educated at Uppingham School
The Guardian people